Shocking Blue is the debut studio album by Dutch rock band Shocking Blue, released in November 1967 on Polydor. This was the only album by the band with Fred de Wilde on lead vocals. Mariska Veres replaced de Wilde in the band's next album, At Home.

Release
In Germany and Scandinavia the record was released in 1970 under the title Beat with Us, omitting songs "Whisky Don't Wash My Brains" and "League of Angels" from side one. In Japan the album was released in German form as well, but with the original title.

The album was reissued in 2006 on CD with non-album single "Lucy Brown Is Back in Town" and its B-side as bonus tracks.

Track listing
All songs written by Robbie van Leeuwen, except where noted.

Personnel
Shocking Blue
Fred de Wilde - lead vocals, rhythm guitar
Robbie van Leeuwen - guitar, backing vocals
Klaasje van der Wal - bass guitar
Cor van der Beek - drums

References
Beat With Us

1967 debut albums
Shocking Blue albums
Polydor Records albums